The 2020 AFC Cup group stage was played from 10 February to 11 March 2020, before the remaining matches were initially suspended, and eventually cancelled by the AFC on 10 September 2020 due to the COVID-19 pandemic. Under the original competition format, a total of 36 teams would compete in the group stage to decide the 11 places in the knockout stage of the 2020 AFC Cup.

Draw

The draw for the group stage was held on 10 December 2019, 14:00 MYT (UTC+8), at the AFC House in Kuala Lumpur, Malaysia. The 36 teams were drawn into nine groups of four: three groups each in the West Asia Zone (Groups A–C) and the ASEAN Zone (Groups F–H), and one group each in the Central Asia Zone (Group D), the South Asia Zone (Group E), and the East Asia Zone (Group I). Teams from the same association in the West Asia Zone and ASEAN Zone could not be drawn into the same group.

The mechanism of the draw was as follows:
For the West Asia Zone, a draw was held for the five associations with two direct entrants (Syria, Jordan, Kuwait, Bahrain, Lebanon) to determine the order of associations occupying the following group positions (higher-seeded team of each association allocated to first position, lower-seeded team of each association allocated to second position): A1 and B2, B1 and C2, C1 and A2, A3 and B4, B3 and C4. The direct entrant from Oman and the play-off winners were allocated to positions C3 and A4 respectively.
For the ASEAN Zone, a draw was held for the three associations with two direct entrants (Vietnam, Philippines, Singapore) to determine the order of associations occupying the following group positions (higher-seeded team of each association allocated to first position, lower-seeded team of each association allocated to second position): F1 and G2, G1 and H2, H1 and F2; another draw was held for the three associations with one direct entrant (Indonesia, Myanmar, Laos) to determine the order of associations occupying the following group positions (direct entrant of each association allocated to first position, play-off winners which the play-off team of each association may advance from allocated to second position): F3 and G4, G3 and H4, H3 and F4.
For the Central Asia Zone, the South Asia Zone, and the East Asia Zone, no draw was held. The direct entrants were allocated to group positions 1, 2 and 3 according to their association ranking (Central Asia Zone: Tajikistan, Turkmenistan, Kyrgyzstan; South Asia Zone: India, Maldives, Bangladesh; East Asia Zone: Hong Kong, Chinese Taipei, Macau), and the play-off winners were allocated to group positions 4.

The following 36 teams entered into the group stage draw, which included the 29 direct entrants and the seven winners of the play-off round of the qualifying play-offs, whose identity was not known at the time of the draw.

Standby teams
 Al-Wehdat (for Al-Faisaly)
 Al-Salmiya (for Al-Kuwait)
 Al-Muharraq (for Al-Riffa)
 Regar-TadAZ (for Istiklol)
 FC Goa (for Chennai City)
 Geylang International (for Tampines Rovers)
 Persebaya Surabaya (for Bali United)
 Ayeyawady United (for Shan United)

Format

In the group stage, each group was played on a double round-robin basis, with matches played home-and-away before the suspension due to the COVID-19 pandemic, but to be moved to centralised venues after restart which was eventually cancelled. The following teams would have advanced to the knockout stage:
The winners of each group and the best runners-up in the West Asia Zone and the ASEAN Zone would have advanced to the Zonal semi-finals.
The winners of each group in the Central Asia Zone, the South Asia Zone, and the East Asia Zone would have advanced to the Inter-zone play-off semi-finals.

Tiebreakers

The teams were ranked according to points (3 points for a win, 1 point for a draw, 0 points for a loss). If tied on points, tiebreakers were applied in the following order (Regulations Article 10.5):
Points in head-to-head matches among tied teams;
Goal difference in head-to-head matches among tied teams;
Goals scored in head-to-head matches among tied teams;
Away goals scored in head-to-head matches among tied teams; (this tiebreaker was removed since the matches were played in centralised venues after restart)
If more than two teams were tied, and after applying all head-to-head criteria above, a subset of teams were still tied, all head-to-head criteria above were reapplied exclusively to this subset of teams;
Goal difference in all group matches;
Goals scored in all group matches;
Penalty shoot-out if only two teams playing each other in the last round of the group were tied;
Disciplinary points (yellow card = 1 point, red card as a result of two yellow cards = 3 points, direct red card = 3 points, yellow card followed by direct red card = 4 points);
Association ranking;
Drawing of lots.

Schedule
The original schedule of each matchday was as follows.
Matches in the West Asia Zone were played on Mondays and Tuesdays. One or two groups were played on each day, with the following groups played on Mondays:
Matchdays 1 and 2: Groups A and B
Matchday 3: Groups A and C
Matchday 4: Group B
Matchdays 5 and 6: Group C
Matches in the ASEAN Zone were played on Tuesdays and Wednesdays. One or two groups were played on each day, with the following groups played on Tuesdays:
Matchdays 1 and 2: Groups F and G
Matchday 3: Groups F and H
Matchday 4: Group G
Matchdays 5 and 6: Group H
Matches in the Central Asia Zone, the South Asia Zone, and the East Asia Zone were played on Wednesdays. If two teams from the same association were scheduled to play at home on the same matchday, the home match of the lower-seeded team was moved to Tuesday.

Effects of the COVID-19 pandemic
Due to the COVID-19 pandemic in Asia, the AFC announced on 11 February 2020 that the East Asia Zone group stage matches would be postponed to 6 May, 13 May, 20 May, 27 May, 17 June and 24 June.

The following matches were postponed to a later date between late February and early March, prior to AFC's announcement to postpone all matches:
Group A: Hilal Al-Quds v Manama and Al-Ahed v Al-Jaish (9 March)
Group B: Al-Wathba v Al-Ansar and Al-Faisaly v Al-Kuwait (10 March)
Group C: Al-Qadsia v Dhofar (25 February), Al-Qadsia v Al-Jazeera and Al-Riffa v Dhofar (9 March)
Group D: Dordoi v Altyn Asyr (11 March)

The AFC announced on 12 March 2020 that all remaining West Asia Zone group stage matches would be postponed to new dates yet to be confirmed due to the COVID-19 pandemic in Asia.

The AFC announced on 18 March 2020 that all matches would be postponed until further notice due to the COVID-19 pandemic. Only 32 group stage matches out of the 108 scheduled had been played by then.

On 9 July 2020, the AFC announced the new schedule for the remaining matches, with all group stage matches played at centralised venues.

The AFC announced the cancellation of the remainder of the competition on 10 September 2020, due to logistics in coordinating the five zones.

Centralized venues after restart
On 30 July 2020, AFC announced that the ASEAN Zone matches of Groups F and G would be played at the Thống Nhất Stadium, Ho Chi Minh City and Cẩm Phả Stadium, Cẩm Phả, both in Vietnam. Moreover, AFC had earlier confirmed Maldives as the host for the South Asia Zone matches of Group E, which would be played at the National Football Stadium, Malé. On 5 August 2020, AFC announced that Bahrain, Kuwait and Jordan had been confirmed as the hosts for the West Asia Zone matches of Groups A, B and C respectively.

Groups

Group A

Group B

Group C

Group D

Group E

Group F

Group G

Group H

Group I

Notes

References

External links
, the-AFC.com
AFC Cup 2020, stats.the-AFC.com

2
February 2020 sports events in Asia
March 2020 sports events in Asia